Romance Studies is a quarterly peer-reviewed academic journal covering the study of the Romance literatures and cultures. It is published in English, French, Italian, Spanish, and Portuguese by Maney Publishing. It was established in 1982 by Valerie Minogue and Brian Nelson.

Abstracting and indexing 
The journal is abstracted and indexed by Annual Bibliography of English Language and Literature, Arts and Humanities Citation Index, British Humanities Index, Current Contents/Arts & Humanities, International Bibliography of Periodical Literature, MLA International Bibliography, and Scopus.

Editors 
The editors-in-chief are Lloyd Hughes Davies (Swansea University, 2007–present) and Gayle Zachmann (University of Florida, 2016-present). Past editors have been Elizabeth Emery (Montclair State University, 2003-2016), Susan Harrow (Bristol University, 1999–2008), Derek Gagen (1999–2007), Valerie Minogue (1982-2004), and Brian Nelson (1982–1986).

References

External links 
 

Linguistics journals
Romance studies
Quarterly journals
Taylor & Francis academic journals
Publications established in 1982
Multilingual journals
English-language journals
French-language journals
Italian-language journals
Portuguese-language journals
Spanish-language journals